This is a '''list of notable Kazakhs.

Actors, filmmakers and fashion models

Farhat Abdraimov (1966–2021), actor
Shaken Aimanov (1914–1970), film director, actor
Berik Aitjanov (born 1979), actor, film producer
Dinmukhamet Akhimov (born 1948), actor
Damir Amangeldin (born 2002), actor
Emir Baigazin (born 1984), actor, film director
Timur Bekmambetov (born 1961), film director
Bukeyeva Khadisha Bukeyevna (1917–2011), theater and film actress
C.C.TAY (born 2000), singer and actress
Eva Dedova (born 1992), actress
Ruslana Korshunova (1987–2008), international fashion model
Lera Kudryavtseva (born 1971), television presenter, actress
Sergei Lukyanenko (born 1968), author, screenwriter
Rashid Nugmanov (born 1954), film director
Gulshat Omarova (born 1968), writer, film director and actress
Darezhan Omirbaev (born 1958), film director, screenwriter
Linda Nigmatulina (born 1983), actress
Venera Nigmatulina (born 1962), actress
Kuman Tastanbekov (1945–2017), actor
Vladimir Tolokonnikov (1943–2017), actor
Gulnara Sarsenova (born 1961), film producer
Alyona Subbotina (born 1990), international fashion model
Bayan Yessentayeva (born 1974), producer, television presenter, actress
Samal Yeslyamova (born 1984), actress

Artists

Altynai Asylmuratova (born 1961), ballerina
Dilka Bear (born 1977), painter
Agimsaly Duzelkhanov (born 1951), artist
Aigana Gali (born Ayganim Sadykova, 1981), multimedia artist
Aisha Galimbaeva (1917–2008), painter and educator
Gulfairus Mansurovna Ismailova (1929–2013), artist, actress
Lazzate Maralbayeva (born 1951), painter and architect
Sergey Kalmykov (1891–1967), painter, draughtsman and writer
Abilkhan Kasteev (1904–1973), painter
Zhenis Kakenuly Nurlybayev (born 1965), painter
Rustam Khalfin (1949–2008), painter
Leyla Mahat (born 1970), artist, curator, gallery director, associate professor
Almagul Menlibayeva (born 1969), artist
Shaken Niyazbekov (1938–2014), artist, designer of the flag of Kazakhstan
Edige Niyazov (1940–2009), photographer
Malik Oskenbay (born 1966), artist, sculptor
Yesken Sergebayev (born 1940), sculptor
Chezhina Svetlana (born 1985), comic book artist
Ural Tansykbayev (1904–1974)
Ola Volo, Canadian muralist of Kazakh descent

Writers and poets

Karina Abdullina (born 1976) – poet and singer
Ibrahim Altynsarin (1841–1889) – pedagogue, writer
Mukhtar Auezov (1897–1961) – writer, public figure
Ahmed Baitursynuli (1873–1937) – poet, writer, pedagogue and politician
Alikhan Bukeikhanov (1866–1937) – writer, political activist and environmental scientist
Mir Yakub Dulatuli (1885–1935) – poet, writer and a leader of Alash Orda government
Bukhar-zhirau Kalmakanov (1693–1789) – poet
Aigul Kemelbayeva (born 1965) – prose writer and literary critic
Baqytjan Kanapyanov (born 1951) – poet and lyricist
Mukaghali Makatayev (1931–1976) – akyn, poet
Bauyrjan Momyshuly (1910–1982) – writer, hero of the Soviet Union during World War II
Sabid Mukanov (1900–1973) – poet and writer
Gabit Musirepov (1902–1985) – writer, playwright
Ibrahim Qunanbaiuly (1845–1904) – poet, composer and philosopher
Saken Seifullin (1894–1939) – poet and writer, national activist
Mukhtar Shakhanov (born 1942) – writer, lawmaker, ambassador
Oljas Suleimenov (born 1936) – poet, politician, and anti-nuclear activist
Aigerim Tazhi (born 1981) – poet
Sultanmahmud Toraygirov (1893–1920) – poet and writer
Tauman Torekhanov (born 1931) – writer, journalist and executive editor
Muhammed Shoqan Qanafiya Shynghysuly Walikhanov (1835–1865) – scholar, ethnographer and historian
Ahmad Yasawi (1106–1166) – poet and Sufi (Muslim mystic)
Zhambyl Zhabayuly (1846–1945) – akyn, student of Suinbay
Muhammedjan Jumabayev (1893–1938) – writer, publicist, founder of modern Kazakh literature
Qabdesh Zhumadilov (1936-2021) – writer

Businessmen

Mukhtar Ablyazov (born 1963), BTA Bank
Bulat Abilov (born 1957), Sun & Wind Electric Stations
Vladimir Kim (born 1960), KAZ Minerals 
Vyacheslav Kim (born 1969), Kaspi.kz 
Timur Kulibayev (born 1966), Halyk Bank , son-in-law of Nursultan Nazarbayev
Oleg Novachuk (born 1971), Kazakhmys
Dzhambulat Sarsenov (born 1961), Kazenergy
Margulan Seisembayev (born 1966), Seimar

Composers and musicians

Dilnaz Akhmadieva (born 1980), pop singer
Jania Aubakirova (born 1987), pianist
Roza Baglanova (1922–2011), opera singer
Kulyash Baiseitova (1912–1957), opera singer
Marat Bisengaliev (born 1962), violinist and director of orchestras
Alan Buribayev (born 1979), conductor
Dos Mukasan (formed 1967), rock and pop music group
Zhanar Dugalova (born 1987), singer
Nagima Eskalieva (born 1954), singer
Imanbek (born 2000), DJ and record producer
Makpal Isabekova (born 1984), singer
Shamshi Kaldayakov (1930–1992), composer
Nurzhan Kermenbayev (born 1989), singer
Stanislav Khegai (born 1985), pianist
Almas Kishkenbayev (born 1985), singer
Kristian Kostov (born 2000), Bulgarian-Russian singer of Kazakh descent
Dimash Kudaibergen (born 1994), singer
Erzhan Kulibaev (born 1986), Spanish violinist of Kazakh descent
Erik Kurmangaliev (1959–2008), opera singer
Maria Mudryak (born 1994), operatic soprano
Mayra Muhammad-kyzy (born 1969), opera singer
Ninety One (formed 2015), Qpop band
Aisha Orazbayeva (born 1985), violinist
Kairat Nurtas (born 1989), singer
Makhambet Otemisuly (1804–1846), akyn, composer, leader of rebellious movement against Russian Empire 
Nikolai Pokotylo (born 1984), singer
Roza Rymbayeva (born 1957), singer
Madina Saduakasova (born 1979), opera singer
Kurmangazy Sagyrbaev (1823–1896), composer, instrumentalist and folk artist
Altynay Sapargalieva (born 1989), singer
Eldar Sattarov (born 1973)
Scriptonite (born 1990), rapper, singer-songwriter
Maira Shamsutdinova (1890–1927)
Baluan Sholak (1864–1919), singer, composer
Amir Tebenikhin (born 1977), pianist
Bibigul Tulegenova (born 1929), opera singer
Daneliya Tuleshova (born 2006), singer
Kayrat Tuntekov (born 1986), singer
Ulytau (formed 2001), Folk metal, Neo-classical metal
Anastasiya Usova (born 1988), singer
Tolkyn Zabirova (born 1970), singer
Zhambyl Zhabayuly (1846–1945), Kazakh traditional folksinger
Gaziza Zhubanova (1927–1993), composer
Ziruza (born 1997), Q-pop singer
Akmaral Zykayeva (born 1985), artist, singer-songwriter

Heads of state

Abu'l-Mansur Khan (1711–1781), khan of Middle jüz, leader of Kazakh Khanate (1771–1781)
Abu'l-Khair Muhammed Khan (1693–1748), khan of the Kazakh Junior jüz (1725–1748)
Burunduk Khan (?–1511), leader of the Kazakh Khanate (1480–1510)
Esim Khan (?–1628 (1643)), leader of the Kazakh Khanate (1598–1628 (1643)) 
Janibek Khan (1428–1480), founder and co-leader of Kazakh Khanate (1465–1480)
Qasim Khan (1445–1521), leader of the Kazakh Khanate (1510–1521)
Muhammed Khan (1480–1523), leader of the Kazakh Khanate (1521–1523) 
Tahir Khan (?–1533), leader of the Kazakh Khanate (1523–1533)
Ahmed Khan (?–1536), leader of the Kazakh Khanate (1533–1536)
Haqnazar Khan (1509–1580), leader of the Kazakh Khanate (1538–1580) 
Salqam-Jahangir Khan (1610–1652), leader of the Kazakh Khanate (1643–1652) 
Kenesary Khan (1802–1847), khan of all three jüzes (1841–1847)
Kerei Khan (?–1465), founder and co-leader of Kazakh Khanate (1456–1465)
Tauke Khan (?–1718), leader of the Kazakh Khanate (1680–1718)
Dinmukhamed Kunaev (1912–1993), First Secretary of the Communist Party of the Kazakh SSR (1960–1962, 1964–1986), Prime Minister, President Kazakhstan Academy of Sciences
Nursultan Nazarbayev (born 1940), President of Kazakhstan
Jumabay Shayahmetov (1902–1966), First Secretary of the Communist Party of the Kazakh SSR (1946–1954), former NKVD officer who participated in repressions against Kazakh people

Philosophers 

Miftahetdin Akmulla (1831–1895), educator, poet and philosopher
Al-Farabi (872–950), scientist, philosopher and mathematician
Shakarim Qudayberdiuli (1858–1931), poet, theologian, philosopher
Ibrahim Qunanbaiuly (1845–1904), poet, translator, composer and philosopher.
Ahmad Yasavi (1106–1166), poet and Sufi (Muslim mystic)

Politicians and activists 

Gulshara Abdykhalikova (born 1965), politician
Byrganym Aitimova (born 1953), ambassador, minister, former Komsomol leader who supported Soviet government rogue actions against Kazakh people during Jeltoqsan
Zhanar Aitzhanova (born 1965), politician, Permanent Representative of the Republic of Kazakhstan to the United Nations Office at Geneva
Daniyal Akhmetov (born 1954), Prime Minister
Akhmet Baitursynov (1873–1937), poet, writer and politician
Nurlan Balgimbayev (1947–2015), Prime Minister
Osman Bahadur (1899–1951), fighter for the freedom of the Kazakh people in Xinjiang
Alikhan Bukeikhanov (1866–1937), writer, political activist and environmental scientist
Tamara Duisenova (born 1965), politician, e Minister of Labour and Social Protection of the Population
Mir Yaqub Dulatuli (1885–1935), poet, writer and a leader of Alash Orda government
Kabibulla Dzhakupov, former Chair of the Mazhilis from 2014 to 2016 
Janabil (born 1934), politician in China
Guljan Karagusova (born 1950), member of Majilis, Minister of Labour and Social Protection 
Ashat Kerimbay (born 1947), politician in China
Oralbeg Abdu Kerimovic, Secretary General of the government of Kazakhstan 
Yurii Khitrin, Prosecutor General
Dinmukhamed Kunaev (1912–1993), soviet politician, First Secretary of the Kazakh Communist Party between 1960–1962 and 1964–1986
Muhambet Kopeev (born 1949), Kazakh senator, former Deputy Chairman of the Senate of Kazakhstan and Mazhilis, former Minister of Emergency Situations
Eset Kotibaruli (1803–1889), leader of the anti-colonial war against Russian Empire
Mukhtar Kul-Mukhammed (born 1960), senator, former Deputy Chairman of the Nur Otan, and former advisor to the President of Kazakhstan 
Asqar Mamin (born 1965), former Prime Minister
Karim Massimov (born 1965), former Prime Minister
Nursultan Nazarbayev (born 1940), first President of Kazakhstan and founder of the Nur Otan party
Bolat Nurgaliyev (born 1951), diplomat
Makhambet Otemisuly (1804–1846), akyn, composer, leader of rebellious movement against Russian Empire
Toleutai Raqymbekov (born 1964), politician
Qairat Rysqulbekov (1966–1988), participant in Jeltoqsan protests, posthumous Hero of Kazakhstan
Kanat Saudabayev (born 1946), politician, Secretary of State, Minister of Foreign Affairs
Mustafa Shokay (1890–1941), leader of the Kokand revolt (1917) against the Bolsheviks
Älihan Smaiylov (born 1972), current Prime Minister
Oljas Suleimenov (born 1936), poet, politician, and anti-nuclear activist
Imangali Tasmagambetov (born 1956), Prime Minister
Isatay Taymanuly (1791–1838), leader of rebellious movement against Russian Empire
Marat Tazhin (born 1960), Foreign Minister
Kassym-Jomart Tokayev (born 1953), Foreign Minister, Prime Minister, and current President of Kazakhstan
Janseiıt Tüimebaev (born 1958), Minister of Education and Science
Aman Tuleyev (born 1944), governor of Kemerovo Oblast, Russia
Mukhamedzhan Tynyshpaev (1879–1953), Kazakh engineer, ethnographer, historian, and political activist
Akhmetzhan Yessimov (born 1960), Kazakh politician and former chairman of Samruk-Kazyna
Adilbek Zhaksybekov (born 1954), politician, State Secretary, Minister

Military 

Nurken Abdirov (1919–1942), fighter pilot, Hero of the Soviet Union
Aidyn Aimbetov (born 1972), fighter pilot and cosmonaut
Toktar Aubakirov (born 1946), first Kazakh in space, MP
Mukhtar Aymakhanov (born 1967), cosmonaut
Rahim-Bek Bahadur (1705–?), warrior in the 18th century against Dzungars
Nasrullah Nauryzbai Bahadur (1706–1781), Kazakh commander in the 18th century who fought against the Dzungars
Murat Bektanov (born 1965), Minister of Defence
Talgat Bigeldinov (1922–2014), Il-2 pilot, only Kazak twice awarded Hero of the Soviet Union
Syrym Datuly (1712–1802), leader of the Kazakhs of the Junior Jüz
Khiuaz Dospanova (1922–2008), aviation navigator, officer in the "night witches"
Manshuk Mametova (1922–1943), World War II machine gunner, posthumous Hero of the Soviet Union
Murat Maikeyev (born 1959), military figure
Aliya Moldagulova (1925–1944), female Soviet sniper during World War II
Bauırjan Momyshuly (1910–1982), writer, posthumous Hero of the Soviet Union for actions in World War II
Talgat Musabayev (born 1951), test pilot, former cosmonaut, Director of Aerospace Agency of Republic of Kazakhstan
Sagadat Nurmagambetov (1924–2013), Soviet and Kazakh general 
Rahimjan Qoshqarbaev (1924–1988), first soldier to raise the Soviet flag in the Reichstag
Saken Zhasuzakov (born 1957), Minister of Defence

Rulers

Kazakh Khans before the jüzs split

 Kerei (1456–1473)
 Janibek (1473–1480)
 Burunduk (1480–1511)
 Qasim (1511–1518)
 Muhammed (1518–1523)
 Tahir (1523–1533)
 Ahmed (1533–1535)
 Haqnazar (1538–1580)
 Jangir (1628–1652)
 Tauke (1680–1715)
 Abu'l-Mansur (1771–1781)
 Kenesary (1841–1847)

Junior jüz khans

 Abu'l-Khair (1718–1748)
 Nur Ali (1748–1786)

Middle jüz khans

 Abu'l-Mansur (1771–1781)

Scientists 

Serikbolsyn Abdildin (1937–2019), economist and politician
Murat Aitkhozhin (1939–1987), molecular biologist
Kimal Akishev (1924–2003), scientist, archeologist, and historian
Ken Alibek (born 1950), microbiologist
Sarsen Amanzholov (1903–1958), linguist, Turkologist
Gulsum Asfendiyarova (1880–1937), medical doctor, health care system organizer
Kaisha Atakhanova (born 1957), genetic biologist
Shafik Chokin (1912–2003), engineer, President of Academy of Sciences 
Mirza Muhammad Haidar Dughlat (1499/1500–1551), historian, Chagatai Turco-Mongol military general
Askar Dzhumadildayev (born 1956), mathematician
Alexandra Elbakyan (born 1988), computer programmer
Orazak Ismagulov (born 1930), anthropologist
Zhenis Kembayev (born 1975), jurist
Tasbolat Mukhametkaliev (1937–2019), scientist
Abilbek Nurmagambetov (1927–1998), linguist-etymologist
Marat Sarsembaev (born 1947), jurist
Kanysh Satbayev (1899–1964), engineer, geologist, President of Academy of Sciences
Mukhamedzhan Tynyshpaev (1879–1937), engineer, enthnographer, historian, activist

Sportspersons

Boxers 

Berik Abdrakhmanov (born 1986) – boxer, 2012 Asian Lightweight champion, bronze medal at the 2013 World Championships
Merey Akshalov (born 1988) – boxer, gold medal at the 2013 World Championships, won a gold at the 2013 Asian Championships
Janibek Alimkhanuly – (born 1993) – boxer, gold at the 2013 World Championships and Asian Championships, won another gold at the 2014 Asian Games
Abilkhan Amankul (born 1997) – boxer, won a silver medal at the 2017 World Championships
Bakhtiyar Artayev (born 1983) – champion of the 2004 Summer Olympics
Saken Bibossinov (born 1997) – bronze medal winner of the 2020 Summer Olympics
Mukhtarkhan Dildabekov (born 1976) – silver medal winner of the 2000 Summer Olympics
Gennady Golovkin (born 1982) – silver medal winner of the 2004 Summer Olympics, current WBC, IBF,  WBA Super Middleweight and IBO champion
Yermakhan Ibraimov (born 1972) – bronze medal winner of the 1996 Summer Olympics, champion of the 2000 Summer Olympics
Kanat Islam (born 1984) – bronze medal winner of the 2008 Summer Olympics,  WBA Inter-Continental, WBO NABO,  WBO Inter-Continental, WBA Fedelatin,  WBA Fedecaribe Super welterweight
Nurzhan Karimzhanov (born 1980) – boxer, won a gold medal at the 2002 Asian Games
Serik Konakbayev (born 1959) – silver medal winner of the 1980 Summer Olympics 
Kamshybek Kunkabayev – bronze medal winner of the 2020 Summer Olympics
Nazym Kyzaibay (born 1993) – boxer, won gold medals at the 2014 and 2016 World Championships
Adilbek Niyazymbetov– silver medal winner of the 2012 Summer Olympics, 2016 Summer Olympics
Bulat Niyazymbetov (born 1972) – bronze medal winner of the 1996 Summer Olympics
Bekzad Nurdauletov (born 1998) – boxer, won a gold medal at the 2019 World Championships
Aibek Oralbay (born 2000) – boxer, won a gold medal at the 2018 Youth Olympics
Milana Safronova (born 1991) – boxer, won a bronze medal at the 2019 World Championships
Serik Sapiyev (born 1983) – boxer, champion of the 2012 Summer Olympics
Bakhyt Sarsekbayev (born 1981) – champion of the 2008 Summer Olympics
Bekzat Sattarkhanov (1980–2000) – champion of the 2000 Summer Olympics
Dariga Shakimova (born 1988) – bronze medal winner of the 2016 Summer Olympics
Zhaina Shekerbekova (born 1989) – boxer, won a silver medal at the 2018 World Championships
Beibut Shumenov (born 1983) – professional boxer
Yerkebulan Shynaliyev (born 1987) – bronze medal winner of the 2008 Summer Olympics
Daniyar Yeleussinov (born 1991) – champion of the 2016 Summer Olympics 
Serik Yeleuov (born 1980) – bronze medal winner of the 2004 Summer Olympics
Kairat Yeraliyev (born 1990) – boxer, won a gold medal at the 2017 World Championships
Birzhan Zhakypov (born 1984) – gold medal winner at the 2013 World Championships
Yerdos Zhanabergenov (born 1983) – champion of the 2005 World Amateur Boxing Championships
Dina Zholaman – boxer, won a gold medal at the 2016 World Championships
Bulat Zhumadilov (born 1973) – silver medal winner of the 1996 Summer Olympics and 2000 Summer Olympics

Wrestling

Greek-Roman (Classic) style 

Meirambek Ainagulov (born 1994) – won a silver medal at the 2017 World Championships and a silver medal at the 2022 Asian Championships
Valery Anisimov (born 1937) – won a gold medal at the 1965 World Championships
Bakhtiyar Baiseitov (born 1971) – won a gold medal at the 1998 World Championships
Darkhan Bayakhmetov (born 1985) – won a gold medal at the 2009 Asian Championships
Askhat Dilmukhamedov (born 1986) – won a gold medal at the 2018 Asian Championships
Asset Imanbayev (born 1981) – won a gold medal at the 2002 Asian Games and two gold medals at the Asian Championships, in 2003 and 2004
Yerulan Iskakov (born 1988) – won a gold medal at the 2014 Asian Championships
Rassul Kaliyev (born 1991) – won a gold medal at the 2014 Asian Championships
Doszhan Kartikov (born 1989) – won a gold medal at the 2016 Asian Championships and a bronze medal at the 2015 World Championships
Almat Kebispayev (born 1987) – won two gold medals at the Asian Championships, in 2011 and 2018, and a silver medal at the 2011 World Championships 
Asset Mambetov (born 1982) – bronze medal winner of the 2008 Summer Olympics
Roman Melyoshin (born 1983) – won a gold medal at the 2006 Asian Games
Kazhymukan Munaitpasov (1871–1948) – first Kazakh who won a World Championship in 1908 
Anatoly Nazarenko (born 1948) – won a silver medal at the 1972 Olympics
Walihan Sailike (Kazakh: Уалихан Сайлық) – Greco-Roman wrestler. Bronze medal winner in the 60 kg event at the 2018 World Wrestling Championships. Bronze medal winner in the 2020 Summer Olympics held in Tokyo, Japan
Andrey Samokhin (born 1985) – won a silver medal at the 2009 Asian Championships
Tamerlan Shadukayev (born 1996) – won a gold medal at the 2020 Asian Championships
Meirzhan Shermakhanbet (born 1996) – won a gold medal at the 2022 Asian Championships and a bronze medal at the 2018 World Championships
Shamil Serikov (1956–1989) – champion of the 1980 Summer Olympics
Aidos Sultangali (born) – won a gold medal at the 2021 Asian Championships and two bronze medals at the World Championships, in 2018 and 2022
Elmurat Tasmuradov (born 1991) – bronze medal winner of the 2016 Summer Olympics
Nurbakyt Tengizbayev (born 1983) – silver medal winner of the 2008 Summer Olympics
Nurmakhan Tinaliyev (born 1988) – won two gold medal at the Asian Games, in 2010 and 2014; and two gold medals at the Asian Championships, in 2013 and 2015
Daulet Turlykhanov (born 1963) – silver medal winner of the 1992 Summer Olympics, silver bronze-winner of the 1996 Summer Olympics
Nursultan Tursynov (born 1991) – won a gold medal at the 2014 Asian Championship
Zhaksylyk Ushkempirov (1951–2020) – champion of the 1980 Summer Olympics
Demeu Zhadrayev (born 1989) – won a silver medal at the 2017 World Championships and another silver medal at the 2018 Asian Championships
Khorlan Zhakansha (born 1992) – won a silver medal at the 2019 World Championships
Dauren Zhumagaziyev (born 1989) – won a gold medal at the 2011 Asian Championships and a silver medal at the 2011 World Championships

Freestyle 

Aiyim Abdildina (born 1989) – won a bronze medal at the 2016 World Championships
Islam Bairamukov (born 1971) – silver medal winner of the 2000 Summer Olympics
Zhamila Bakbergenova (born 1996) – won two silver medals (2021, 2022) at the World Championships and two gold medals (2020, 2022) at the Asian Championships
Zhuldyz Eshimova (born 1988) – won a bronze medal at the 2008 World Championships and a gold medal at the 2007 Asian Championships
Nurkozha Kaipanov (born 1998) – won a silver medal at the 2019 World Championships and two gold medals at the Asian Championships
Yekaterina Larionova (born 1994) – bronze medal winner of the 2016 Summer Olympics
Maulen Mamyrov (born 1970) – bronze medal winner of the 1996 Summer Olympics
Daulet Niyazbekov (born 1989) – won a silver medal at the 2019 World Championships and three gold medals at the Asian Championships
Daulet Shabanbay (born 1983) – bronze medal winner of the 2012 Summer Olympics
Baluan Sholak (1864–1919) – poet and wrestler
Leonid Spiridonov (born 1980) – won a bronze medal at the 2009 World Championships and two silver medals at the World Cup
Elmira Syzdykova (born 1992) – bronze medal winner of the 2016 Summer Olympics
Akzhurek Tanatarov (born 1986) – bronze medal winner of the 2012 Summer Olympics
Daulet Turlykhanov (born 1963) – bronze medal winner of the 1988 Summer Olympics
Alisher Yergali (born 1999) – won two silver medals at the Asian Championships (2021, 2022)

Judo 

Didar Khamza (born 1997) – won a gold medal at the 2018 Asian Games
Aidyn Smagulov (born 1976) – judoka, bronze medal-winner of the 2000 Summer Olympics
Yeldos Smetov (born 1992) – judoka, silver medal-winner of the 2016 Summer Olympics, bronze medal-winner of the 2020 Summer Olympics
Askhat Zhitkeyev (born 1981) – judoka, silver medal-winner of the 2008 Summer Olympics

Mixed Martial Arts 

Mariya Agapova (born 1997) – UFC fighter
Kairat Akhmetov (born 1987) – mixed martial artist, fighting for ONE Championship
Sergey Morozov (born 1989) – UFC fighter
Shayilan Nuerdanbieke (born 1994) – UFC fighter
 Shavkat Rakhmonov (born 1994) – UFC fighter
Zhalgas Zhumagulov (born 1988) – UFC fighter

Chess 

Bibisara Assaubayeva (born 2004) – International Master (IM), Woman's Grandmaster (WGM), and Women's World Blitz Champion (since 2021)
Zhansaya Abdumalik (born 2000) – International Master (IM) and Woman Grandmaster (WGM)
Gulmira Dauletova (born 1988) – Woman Grandmaster (WGM)
Madina Davletbayeva (born 1989) – Woman Grandmaster (WGM)
Rinat Jumabayev (born 1989) – Grandmaster (GM)
Meruert Kamalidenova (born 2005) – International Master
Murtas Kazhgaleyev (born 1973) – Grandmaster (GM)
Guliskhan Nakhbayeva (born 1991) – International Master (IM) and Woman Grandmaster (WGM)
Dinara Saduakassova (born 1996) – International Master (IM) and Woman Grandmaster (WGM)
Darmen Sadvakasov (born 1978) – Grandmaster (GM)
Dana Tuleyeva-Aketayeva (born 1986) – Woman International Master (WIM)

Ice hockey 
Nik Antropov (born 1980) – former NHL player.
Evgeni Nabokov (born 1975) – former NHL goaltender (1995–2015).

Football 

Aigerim Aitymova (born 1993) – 2019 Kazakhstan women's national football team
Nuraly Alip (born 1999) – footballer playing for Zenit St. Petersburg
Abat Aymbetov (born 1995) – footballer
Seilda Baishakov (born 1950) – FC Kairat and Soviet Union national  football team (1971–1981)
Marat Bystrov (born 1992) – footballer
Bauyrzhan Islamkhan (born 1993) – footballer, captain of Kazakhstan national team 
Islambek Kuat (born 1993) – footballer
Serikzhan Muzhikov (born 1989) – FC Astana from 2014
Samat Smakov (born 1978) – footballer, General Director for FC Aktobe
Askhat Tagybergen (born 1990) – footballer
Bakhtiyar Zaynutdinov (born 1998) – Kazakh professional footballer, PFC CSKA 
Nurbol Zhumaskaliyev (born 1981) – former footballer, Sports Director for FC Tobol

Other 

Dzinara Alimbekava (born 1996) – biathlete, Olympic Champion of the 2014 Winter Olympics
Darkhan Assadilov – karateka, bronze medal winner of the 2020 Summer Olympics
Assan Bazayev (born 1981) – cyclist
Arman Chilmanov (born 1984) – taekwondo athlete, bronze prize-winner of the 2008 Summer Olympics
Zarina Diyas (born 1993) – tennis player
Dias Keneshev (born 1985) – biathlete
Gusman Kosanov (born 1935) – sprinter, silver medal winner of the 1960 Summer Olympics
Andrei Krukov  (born 1971) – figure skater 
Nurlan Mendygaliyev (1961) – water polo player, bronze medal winner of the 1988 Summer Olympics
Kaisar Nurmaganbetov (born 1977) – flatwater canoer
Assan Takhtakhunov (born 1986) – ski jumper
Denis Ten (1993–2018) – figure skater and 2014 Olympic Bronze Medalist, 2013 World Silver Medalist, and 2015 World Bronze Medalist
Elizabet Tursynbayeva (born 2000) – figure skater and 2019 World Silver Medalist
Alexander Vinokourov (born 1973) – cyclist
Eduard Vinokurov (1942–2010) – Kazakh-born Soviet Olympic and world champion fencer
Yernar Yerimbetov (born 1980) – gymnast
Aliya Yussupova (born 1984) – athlete
Radik Zhaparov (born 1984) – ski jumper
Alzhan Zharmukhamedov (born 1944) – basketball player, gold medalist at the 1972 Summer Olympics, bronze medal winner of the 1976 Summer Olympics

Weightlifting 

Zulfiya Chinshanlo (born 1993) – champion of the 2012 Summer Olympics, bronze medal winner of the 2020 Summer Olympics
Ilya Ilyin (born 1988) – champion of the 2008 Summer Olympics and 2012 Summer Olympics
Farkhad Kharki (born 1991) – bronze medal winner of the 2016 Summer Olympics 
Maiya Maneza (born 1985) – won two golds (2009, 2010) at the World Weightlifting Championships
Anna Nurmukhambetova (born 1993) – bronze medal winner of the 2012 Summer Olympics
Zhazira Zhapparkul (born 1993) – silver medal winner of the 2016 Summer Olympics

See also
List of people by nationality

References

External links
 Great People of Kazakhstan

Kazakh